The Station Agent is a 2003 American comedy-drama film written and directed by Tom McCarthy in his directorial debut. It stars Peter Dinklage as a man who seeks solitude in an abandoned train station in the Newfoundland section of Jefferson Township, New Jersey. It also stars Patricia Clarkson, Michelle Williams, Bobby Cannavale and John Slattery. For his writing achievement, McCarthy won the BAFTA Award for Best Original Screenplay, the Independent Spirit Award for Best First Screenplay and the Waldo Salt Screenwriting Award while the film itself also won the John Cassavetes Award.

Plot
Finbar McBride, a quiet, unmarried man with dwarfism, is a nihilist who has a deep love of railroads and lives a solitary existence. He works in a Hoboken, New Jersey, model train hobby shop owned by his elderly and similarly taciturn friend Henry Styles. Because he feels ostracized by a public that tends to view him as peculiar due to his size, Fin keeps to himself.

When Henry dies unexpectedly, Fin is told that the hobby shop is to be closed. However, he also learns that Henry has bequeathed him a piece of rural property with an abandoned train depot on it. He moves into the old building hoping for a life of solitude, but he quickly finds himself reluctantly becoming enmeshed in the lives of his neighbors. Joe Oramas, a Cuban American, is operating his father's roadside snack truck while the elder man recovers from an illness, and Olivia Harris is an artist trying to cope with the sudden death of her young son two years earlier and the ramifications it has had on her marriage to David, from whom she is separated; Olivia's initial and secondary meetings with Fin almost get him killed when she is distracted while driving her car. Cleo is a young girl who shares Fin's interest in trains and wants him to lecture her class about them. Emily is the local librarian, a young woman dismayed to discover she is pregnant by her ne'er-do-well boyfriend.

Joe, relentlessly upbeat and overly talkative, soon cracks through Fin's reserve. The two begin to take daily walks along the tracks, and after Olivia gives Fin a movie camera, Joe drives alongside a passing train so that Fin can film it. Joe and Fin sleep at Olivia's house after watching the footage and the next morning a flustered, unannounced David is greeted by the two of them. The three forge a tentative friendship that is threatened when Olivia descends into a deep depression, disappearing from the town. Meanwhile, Emily seeks solace in Fin, who slowly is realizing interaction with other humans may not be as unpleasant as he thought. Fin tries to protect Emily from her boyfriend at a bar, but he pushes Fin aside, causing Fin to lapse back into his asocial behaviour. Emily later comes to apologize, and after she and Fin share a kiss, she spends the night with Fin after asking if she can "just sleep" there. Cleo asks Fin if Olivia is coming back, to which he replies that he doesn't know. He decides to keep an eye on Olivia's house, but when he spots her fighting on the phone with David and he goes up on the porch, Olivia angrily tells him to leave. Fin spends the night drinking and, collapsing on the track, is passed over by a train, undamaged but for his pocket watch. As if feeling blessed by his gift of life (and symbolically upon his watch getting destroyed in the train mishap), Fin walks up to Olivia's home only to find she has attempted suicide. Olivia reveals that David is having another baby with a different woman. Fin takes care of Olivia's home while she recuperates in the hospital. Fin picks up the courage to talk to school kids about trains.

Olivia, Joe, and Fin share a meal at Olivia's house, their conversation filled with some small talk and reconciliation. Olivia and Joe tease Fin about Emily, suggesting he go seek her again.

Production
The Station Agent was shot on 16 mm film in 20 days with a budget of half a million dollars.

According to writer-director Tom McCarthy's commentary on the DVD release of the film, it was shot on a shoestring budget in a limited amount of time. Locations used included Lake Hopatcong, Dover, Hibernia, Rockaway Township, Rockaway Borough, Hoboken, Newfoundland and Oak Ridge, New Jersey, as well as Bucks County, Pennsylvania. The Newfoundland station, originally built by the New Jersey Midland Railway in 1872, is located in Newfoundland, New Jersey, on the active New York, Susquehanna and Western Railway.

Cast
Peter Dinklage as Finbar McBride
Patricia Clarkson as Olivia Harris
Bobby Cannavale as Joe Oramas
Michelle Williams as Emily
Raven Goodwin as Cleo
Paul Benjamin as Henry Styles
Jayce Bartok as Chris
Joe Lo Truglio as Danny
John Slattery as David
Lynn Cohen as Patty
Richard Kind as Louis Tiboni
Josh Pais as Carl

Reception
The film premiered at the Sundance Film Festival and was shown at the Toronto International Film Festival and the San Sebastián Film Festival before going into limited release in the US on October 3, 2003. Playing in three theaters, it grossed $57,785 on its opening weekend with an average of $19,261 per theater and ranking 55th at the box office. The film's widest release was 198 theaters and it ended up earning $5,739,376 domestically and $2,940,438 internationally for a total of $8,679,814, well above its estimated $500,000 production budget.

The film received a very positive response from critics. It has a rating of 94% on Rotten Tomatoes based on 160 reviews with an average rating of 8.00/10. The website's critical consensus states, "A sweet and quirky film about a dwarf, a refreshment stand operator, and a reclusive artist connecting with one another." The film also has a score of 81 out of 100 on Metacritic based on 36 reviews.

Elvis Mitchell of The New York Times observed, "Tom McCarthy has such an appreciation for quiet that it occupies the same space as a character in this film, a delicate, thoughtful and often hilarious take on loneliness . . . it's the kind of appetizing movie you want to share with others."

Roger Ebert of the Chicago Sun-Times said, "[T]his is a comedy, but it's also sad, and finally, it's simply a story about trying to figure out what you love to do and then trying to figure out how to do it . . . It is a great relief . . . that The Station Agent is not one of those movies in which the problem is that the characters have not slept with each other and the solution is that they do. It's more about the enormous unrealized fears and angers that throb beneath the surfaces of their lives."

Ruthe Stein of the San Francisco Chronicle called it "as touching and original a movie as you're likely to see this year" and "a remarkably assured first film."

Peter Travers of Rolling Stone said, "Tom McCarthy has a gift for funny and touching nuances . . . The three actors could not be better. Huge feelings are packed into this small, fragile movie. It's something special."

James Christopher of The Times stated, "The brilliance of Peter Dinklage's performance as the ironclad loner is that he doesn’t much care. Yet there’s something deeply affecting about his stoicism and suspicion that has nothing to do with artificial sweeteners, Disney sentiment, or party political broadcasts on behalf of dwarfs. Dinklage just gets on with his performance like an actor who can't understand why he's got the lead role. It's this tension between the film and the unwilling Romeo that makes The Station Agent such a hypnotic watch."

Accolades

References

External links
 

 Location of Fin's train station (Google Street View) (OpenStreetMap)

2003 directorial debut films
2003 films
2003 independent films
2000s American films
2000s English-language films
2000s psychological drama films
American comedy-drama films
American independent films
American psychological drama films
BAFTA winners (films)
Films about people with dwarfism
Films directed by Tom McCarthy
Films scored by Stephen Trask
Films set in New Jersey
Films shot in 16 mm film
Films shot in New Jersey
Films whose writer won the Best Original Screenplay BAFTA Award
John Cassavetes Award winners
Sundance Film Festival award winners
Rail transport films
Rockaway Township, New Jersey